The province of Ferrara is a province in the region of Emilia-Romagna, Italy. Its provincial capital is the city Ferrara. It contains 23 comuni, listed at list of communes of the Province of Ferrara. Its president is Barbara Paron.

History
The province of Ferrara is believed to have been first settled in by the Romans at the site "Forum Alieni", although remains of the coastal port of Spina have been unearthed near Comacchio by archaeologists. Ferrara was first mentioned when it was conquered by Germanic tribe the Lombards in 753 CE, and the Byzantine Empire lost its rule over the city. It was gifted to the Holy See by the Franks in either 754 or 756 CE, and was led by the Bishops of Ravenna. Benedictine and Cistercian monasteries started reclaiming Podeltan lands in the 9th century.

In 1055, the partially independent town of Fererra was given imperial powers, but was led by Matilda of Tuscany from 1101 and Frederick I, Holy Roman Emperor from 1158. Members of the House of Este took control of the city during the 13th century, and formed a university in Ferrara in 1391. Walls were built around the perimeter of Ferrara in the 15th and 16th centuries. It joined the Papal States in 1598. Its citadel was occupied by the Austrians in 1831 after the Italian United Provinces was formed, and the Austrians occupied the city in 1847. On 21 June 1859 the Austrians left the city of Ferrara and it was able to join the Kingdom of Italy.

In 1921, Italo Balbo joined the newly created National Fascist Party and soon became a secretary of the Ferrara fascist organization. He began to organize Fascist gangs and formed his own group. They broke strikes for local landowners and attacked communists and socialists in the region. His success in Ferrara set in motion the rapid rise of Fascism in northern Italy and played an important role in the transformation of Fascism into a major political movement.

Geography
The province of Ferarra is one of nine provinces in the region of Emilia-Romagna in the northeast of Italy. It is the most northerly province in the region to abut onto the Adriatic Sea. The Province of Rovigo in the Veneto region lies immediately to the north and the Province of Mantua in Lombardy to the northwest. To the west lies the Province of Modena and the Province of Bologna, and the Province of Ravenna lies to the south.

References

External links
 

 
Ferrara